Vermilion Regional Airport  is a public-use airport located five miles northeast of Danville, the largest city in Vermilion County, Illinois. It is publicly owned by the Vermilion Regional Airport Authority. The FAA's National Plan of Integrated Airport Systems for 2017–2021 categorized it as a general aviation basic facility.

It was formerly Vermilion County Airport, under which name it opened in 1948.

Airline flights began in 1950 on Ozark; Lake Central arrived in 1954-55 and Ozark left in 1961. Allegheny Commuter flights ended sometime after 1973. The airport currently gets has regular flights from Air Cargo Carriers and gets aerial agricultural flights as well. The airport also features both a flying club and a glider club as well as aircraft maintenance facilities.

Facilities 
It has two asphalt runways: 3/21 is 6,006 by 100 feet (1,831 x 30 m) with an ILS; 16/34 is 3,999 by 100 feet (1,219 x 30 m). The airport also has runway 12/30, a turf runway measuring 2500 x 150 ft (762 x 46 m).

The airport also features pilot facilities like a 24-hour lounge and hangar rentals.The former terminal building is now a banquet and conference center called Cloud 9.

Aircraft 

For the 12-month period ending April 30, 2020, the airport had 18,150 aircraft operations, an average of 50 per day: 93% general aviation, 6% air taxi and 1% military. 
In November 2020, there were 55 aircraft based at the airport: 48 single-engine, 5 multi-engine, 1 helicopter and 1 glider.

References

External links 

 Vermilion Regional Airport
 

Airports in Illinois
Transportation in Vermilion County, Illinois
Buildings and structures in Vermilion County, Illinois
Former Essential Air Service airports